Wafia Al-Rikabi (born 4 August 1993), known professionally as Wafia, is an Australian singer-songwriter of Iraqi-Syrian origin. Originally studying biomedicine at university, she began to write songs to escape its monotony. Her breakthrough hit was a cover of Mario's "Let Me Love You", which garnered almost 5 million plays on SoundCloud.

Career
Al-Rikabi has since signed to indie record label Future Classic, releasing her debut EP XXIX in November 2015. The EP's lead single "Heartburn", produced by Ta-ku, received praise from producer Pharrell Williams being played during his Beats 1 radio show.

In March 2016, she released the single "Window Seat" in collaboration with the New Zealand artist Thomston. Later in August 2016, she collaborated again with the Australian producer Ta-ku, releasing the EP . The EP features a story about compromise in relationships, which both Wafia and Ta-ku experienced independently in of each other in their lives.

Wafia released a new single, "Bodies", in late 2017. It was written on the day her family members were denied refugee status for entrance into Australia, which influenced the track's lyrics. However, due to her dislike of pseudo-intellectual feeling music, the track was instead upbeat in contrast to the lyrics in an attempt to make the song accessible.

Wafia's single "I'm Good" was voted number 14 on Triple J's Hottest 100 of 2018.

Discography

Extended plays

Singles

As lead artist

As featured artist

References

External links
 

1993 births
21st-century Australian singers
21st-century Australian women singers
Australian women pop singers
Australian musicians
Australian people of Iraqi descent
Australian people of Syrian descent
Future Classic artists
Living people